Guadalupe is a municipality of the Brazilian state of Piaui. It is located in latitude 06° 47' 13" south and longitude 43° 34' 09" west, with an elevation of 177 meters.

The Boa Esperança Hydroelectric Power Plant is in Guadalupe, and provides electricity to the state of Piauí.

References

Municipalities in Piauí